The Symphony in F-sharp, Op. 40, is the only symphony by 20th-century Austrian composer Erich Wolfgang Korngold, although as a teenager in 1912 he had written a Sinfonietta, his Op. 5. Using a theme from the 1939 film The Private Lives of Elizabeth and Essex, the symphony was completed in 1952 and dedicated to the memory of American president Franklin D. Roosevelt, who had died seven years earlier.

The work's premiere on Austrian radio on 17 October 1954 by the Vienna Symphony Orchestra under Harold Byrns was described as "poorly rehearsed and performed,". In 1959 Dimitri Mitropoulos wrote: "All my life I have searched for the perfect modern work. In this symphony I have found it. I shall perform it the next season." Then Mitropoulos's death intervened, and in fact the symphony did not enjoy its first concert outing until 27 November 1972, in Munich under Rudolf Kempe. It was however aired several times on European radio.

More recently the work has entered the repertoire with a number of CD recordings, and the score has been published by Schott Musik in their Eulenburg Series. The work calls for a large orchestra: 3 flutes (3rd doubling piccolo), 2 oboes, 2 clarinets, bass clarinet, 2 bassoons, double bassoon, 4 horns, 3 trumpets, 4 trombones, tuba, timpani, percussion (3 players are handling: bass drum, cymbals, gong, glockenspiel, marimba, xylophone), harp, piano (doubling celesta) and strings. The symphony lasts about 50 minutes and is in four movements:
 Moderato, ma energico — intense and stormy, with a jagged main theme
 Scherzo: Allegro molto
 Adagio: Lento — long, profound and meditative, in the tradition of Anton Bruckner. A memorial to Roosevelt.
 Finale: Allegro — optimistic; listeners will recognize references to film music and the song, "Over There".

Recordings

Werner Andreas Albert - Nordwestdeutsche Philharmonie - cpo
Marc Albrecht - Orchestre philharmonique de Strasbourg - Pentatone
Sir Edward Downes - BBC Philharmonic - Chandos
Rudolf Kempe - Munich Philharmonic - RCA
André Previn - London Symphony Orchestra - DGG
James DePreist - Oregon Symphony - Delos
John Storgårds - Helsinki Philharmonic Orchestra - Ondine
Timothy Vernon - McGill Symphony Orchestra - McGill
Franz Welser-Möst - Philadelphia Orchestra - EMI
John Wilson (conductor) - Sinfonia of London - Chandos

References

Korngold 2
Compositions by Erich Wolfgang Korngold
1952 compositions
Compositions in F-sharp major